The Best of Tim Hardin is a compilation album by folk artist Tim Hardin, released in 1969. All the songs are taken from Tim Hardin 1 and Tim Hardin 2.

The album was released again in 1974 on the Archetypes label and is out of print although all the songs are available on other Hardin compilations.

Track listing 
All songs by Tim Hardin unless otherwise noted.

Side one 
 "Don't Make Promises" 2:22
 "It'll Never Happen Again" 2:35
 "Tribute to Hank Williams" 3:10
 "Misty Roses" 1:59
 "How Can We Hang On To a Dream" 2:06

Side two 
 "If I Were a Carpenter" 2:41
 "Reason to Believe" 1:59
 "Black Sheep Boy" 1:58
 "Red Balloon" 2:37
 "Smugglin' Man" 1:56
 "Lady Came from Baltimore" 1:49

Personnel 
Tim Hardin – vocals, guitar

References 

Tim Hardin albums
1969 greatest hits albums
Verve Forecast Records compilation albums
Albums produced by Erik Jacobsen